ARTnews is an American visual-arts magazine, based in New York City. It covers art from ancient to contemporary times. ARTnews is the oldest and most widely distributed art magazine in the world. It has a readership of 180,000 in 124 countries. It includes news dispatches from correspondents, investigative reports, reviews of exhibitions, and profiles of artists and collectors.

History and operations

The magazine was founded by James Clarence Hyde in 1902 as Hydes Weekly Art News and was originally published eleven times a year.

From vol. 3, no. 52 (November 5, 1904) to vol. 21, no. 18 (February 10, 1923), the magazine was published as American Art News. From February 1923 to the present, the magazine has been published as The Art News then ARTnews.

The magazine's art critics and correspondents include Arthur Danto, Linda Yablonsky, Barbara Pollock, Margarett Loke, Hilarie Sheets, Yale School of Art dean Robert Storr, Doug McClemont and Museum of Modern Art director Glenn D. Lowry.

In April 2014, Milton and Judith Esterow, the magazine's owners since 1972, sold the publication to Skate Capital Corp., a private asset-management firm owned by Sergey Skaterschikov. It was later revealed that Skate Capital was acting on behalf of the Polish company Abbey House, which renamed itself ARTNEWS SA.

Following this change in ownership the magazine merged with Art in America in June 2015, owned by Brant Publication's BMP Media Holdings, LLC. In October 2015 the publishing cadence of ARTnews was reduced to quarterly. In 2016, Brant Publications took full control of BMP.

In 2018, Penske Media Corporation, the parent company of Variety Magazine, acquired ARTnews and Art in America.Awards
The magazine has won the George Polk Award, the National Magazine Award for General Excellence, the National Headliner Award and the National Arts Club Distinguished Citation for Merit.

The ARTnews Top 200 Collectors
The ARTnews'' Top 200 list is released annually and contains the top individual art collectors from around the world based on interviews with collectors, curators, dealers, auction houses, and museums. Those on the list are also surveyed, and their responses are used to inform trends and provide data, such as a breakdown of where the most top art collectors live (the United States).

Collectors on the list are profiled with a brief biography focused on the type of art that they collect (contemporary, post war, modern, etc.) and includes their city or cities of residence, a photo, their source of wealth and the years they have been on the Top 200 list, as many collectors are on it for multiple years. The list released in September 2018 includes Leonard Lauder, Edythe and Eli Broad, Rebecca and Warren Eisenberg, Alison and Peter Klein, Marsha and Jeffrey Perelman, Tatsumi Sako, Sheri and Howard Schultz. The full list is announced in both the print and online versions of the magazine.

See also

 List of art magazines
 List of United States magazines

References

External links
 
 Artnews Top 200 Collectors

1902 establishments in the United States
English-language magazines
Magazines established in 1902
Magazines published in New York City
Midtown Manhattan
Monthly magazines published in the United States
Quarterly magazines published in the United States
Visual arts magazines published in the United States
Weekly magazines published in the United States
Works about visual art